Legions of Bastards is the sixth full studio album by Swedish heavy metal band Wolf, which was released in April 2011 via Century Media Records. It was the band's last album featuring guitarist Johannes Axeman Losbäck, who was replaced by Simon Johansson.

Track listing

Personnel
Band
 Niklas Stålvind – vocals, guitar
 Johannes Axeman Losbäck – guitar
 Anders G Modd – bass guitar
 Richard A Holmgren – drums

Production
 Produced by Pelle Saether
 Artwork by Thomas Holm

External links
 Wolf's Homepage
 Wolf's official Facebook page

References

Century Media Records albums
2011 albums